The Elwetritsch (a.k.a. Elwedritsch, Ilwedritsch and so on), plural Elwetritsche or Elwetritschen, is a birdlike legendary creature which is reported to be found in southwest Germany, especially in the Palatinate. The Elwetritsch can be seen as a local equivalent to mythical creatures of other regions (e.g., the Bavarian Wolpertinger or the Thuringian Rasselbock).

The Elwedritschen had been forgotten for a while, until a gentleman named Espenschied "rediscovered" them. He began to organize "hunting parties" which were harmless pranks. One of the Bavarian Kings was once served roasted, small birds for dinner, which were declared to be Elwetritsche.

Appearance, origin and descendants 
 The Elwedritsch is a fictional creature that supposedly inhabits the Palatinate of Germany. It is described as being a chicken-like creature with antlers. It also has scales instead of feathers. However, it is said that their wings are of little use. That is why they live mainly in underbrush and under vines. Sometimes Elwetritschen are depicted with antlers of a stag and their beaks often appear to be very long. In the second half of the 20th century, artists increasingly portrayed Elwetritschen as female by adding breasts. Elwetritschen supposedly originate from crossbreeding chickens, ducks, and geese with mythical wood creatures such as goblins and elves. Being a fowl, they naturally lay eggs, which as a result of descending from forest spirits, grow during breeding season. Eggs in various sizes are artistically depicted at the Elwetritschenbrunnen in Neustadt an der Weinstraße.

Geographical distribution 
The area in which tales of the Elwetritsch are spread expands from the Palatinate Forest in the west of Germany towards the east across the Upper Rhine Plain to the southern parts of the Odenwald. The mythical creature also appears in the north of Baden-Württemberg. In the Main-Tauber-Kreis, where they are known as “Ilwedridsche”, the children are told that at night the creatures sleep in the crowns of the willow trees standing next to the river Tauber. In Neustadt an der Weinstraße, which is said to be the “capital” of the Elwetritsches, there is an Elwetritsche-fountain, created by Gernot Rumpf. Other sources consider Dahn in the southwestern Palatinate, which also has an Elwetritsche-fountain, Erfweiler or other villages as secret capitals of these creatures.

Pennsylvania 
In Pennsylvania among the Pennsylvania Dutch, the Elwetritsch is known as the Elbedritsch. The lore concerning the Elbedritsch is similar to that of the Elwetritsch in that the victim of the trick was set out with a bag to catch one and left abandoned. The Pennsylvania Dutch are convinced that Palatinate people—their biggest group of ancestors—had taken some “Elbedritschelcher” (diminutive of Elbedritsch) with them “so dass sie kenn Heemweh grigge deede” (so that they wouldn't become homesick). Tales of the Elbedritsche are also documented in Amish communities. The newsletter of the Pennsylvania German Society is Es Elbedritsch.

Hunt 

The idea is very similar to the "snipe hunt." The Elwetritsch is supposedly very shy, but also very curious. A hunting party consists of a "Fänger" (catcher), equipped with a big potato sack and a lantern, and the "Treiber" (beaters). The catcher is led into the woods where the Elwetritsch is supposed to live, instructed to wait in a clearing with his sack and lantern, while the beaters go off, supposedly to flush out the Elwetritsch. The light of the lantern is said to be attractive to the curious creature, so it will come to investigate and will then be caught by the catcher. While he waits, everyone heads back to the pub or wherever the party had previously assembled, to wait for the catcher to realize that he has been fooled.

Like the jackalope, the Elwetritsch is thought to have been inspired by sightings of wild rabbits infected with the Shope papilloma virus, which causes the growth of antler-like tumours in various places, including on the head.

Traditions 
There are clubs in several Palatinate towns and cities that promote the myth of the Elwetritschen. The Elwetrittche-Club in Landau, formed in 1982, is the oldest club. A square dancing club from the same city calls its annual 'Dance-Special' the „Landauer Elwetrittsche-Jagd“ (Landauian Elwetrittche-Hunt). There is also an Elwetritsche Academy in Pirmasens, a college for „Tritschology“ in Dahn and an exhibition with figures of the mythical creatures in the Landauian zoo as well as in the zoo in Kaiserslautern.

Elwetritsch monuments 
There are several monuments in the Palatinate:
 Dahn:
 Elwetritsche fountain
 Elwetritsche educational trail
 Elwetritsche hiking trail
 Elwetritsche monument in municipal park
 Local carnival club uses Elwetritsche as mascot
 Neustadt an der Weinstraße:
 Elwetritsche fountain (illustrated)
 Wernigerode:
 Elwetritsche fountain 
 Winnweiler:
 Local brewery Bischoff uses Elwetritsche as mascot

See also 
 Skvader
 Jackalope
 Jenny Haniver
 Dahu
 Wolpertinger
 Snipe hunt

References 

Ollivia Moore: Elwetritsche im Speckhemdchen in Verborgene Wesen 2 (German Edition), Twilightline-Verlag Wasungen (2012).

Fictional flightless birds
Legendary birds
Culture of the Palatinate (region)
German legendary creatures